John Fleck may refer to:

John Fleck (actor) (born 1951), American actor
John Fleck (footballer) (born 1991), Scottish footballer